The following is a list of characters in William Shakespeare's As You Like It. Full play here.

The Court of Duke Frederick

Duke Frederick
Duke Frederick is the younger brother of Duke Senior and the father of Celia. Prior to the play he usurps power from his older brother. His hatefulness and paranoia are displayed when he banishes Rosalind, the daughter of Duke Senior. However, at the end of the play, as Duke Frederick brings his army towards the forest to kill his brother, he happens upon an old priest who convinces him to take up the monastic life of peace and simplicity.

Celia

Celia is the daughter of Duke Frederick. She has been portrayed as a foil to her cousin, Rosalind. She displays qualities of the head and heart similar to her cousin. Rosalind and Celia are intimate friends who have been bred and brought up together. It is the love for Rosalind that makes Celia choose a life of voluntary exile. In fact, Celia effects her own individuality so that her cousin may shine brilliantly all the more. 'Celia' literally means 'heavenly' and she is really divine. She may be called the 'moral heroine' of the play as Rosalind is its 'intellectual heroine'.

Touchstone
Touchstone.

Le Beau
Le Beau is a courtier in the Court of Duke Frederick; he commands the court.

Charles

Charles is the court-wrestler, who appears in the first Act of the play. He is a source of some preliminary information regarding the two Dukes and their two daughters. Orlando fights against him in the wrestling match. It is his defeat which makes Orlando a hero enabling him to win the heart of Rosalind. He is also the means to convey Oliver's villainy and serves as a foil to Orlando.

The Exiled Court of Duke Senior in the Forest of Arden

Duke Senior
Duke Senior is the elder brother of Duke Frederick. He has been banished by his younger brother. He, along with his faithful follower, lives in the Forest of Arden and fleets his time careless as they did in the Golden World. His daughter Rosalind is kept at the court by Duke Frederick to company Celia. Duke Senior appears as a contented man who rarely feels adversity. At the end of the play he is restored with the kingdom by Duke Frederick. The father of Rosalind and the rightful ruler of the dukedom in which the play is set. Having been banished by his usurping brother, Frederick, Duke Senior now lives in exile in the Forest of Arden with a number of loyal men, including Lord Amiens and Jaques. We have the sense that Senior did not put up much of a fight to keep his dukedom, for he seems to make the most of whatever life gives him. Content in the forest, where he claims to learn as much from stones and brooks as he would in a church or library, Duke Senior proves himself to be a kind and fair-minded ruler.

Rosalind
 
The daughter of Duke Senior. Rosalind, considered one of Shakespeare's most delightful heroines, is independent-minded, strong-willed, good-hearted, and terribly clever. Rather than slink off into defeated exile, Rosalind resourcefully uses her trip to the Forest of Ardenne as an opportunity to take control of her own destiny. When she disguises herself as Ganymede—a handsome young man—and offers herself as a tutor in the ways of love to her beloved Orlando, Rosalind's talents and charms are on full display. Only Rosalind, for instance, is both aware of the foolishness of romantic love and delighted to be in love. She teaches those around her to think, feel, and love better than they have previously, and she ensures that the courtiers returning from Ardenne are far gentler than those who fled to it.

Jaques

Jaques is one of the followers of Duke Senior. He acts like a cynic throughout the play. He is always in a melancholic mood, earning him the title of Melancholy Jaques and constantly criticizes the Duke and other characters.
Also, he does not like the world of court and always criticizes it. He is a lead, and says two of Shakespeare's most common monologues.

Amiens

Lord Amiens was Elder Duke's friend. Amiens is one of the lords attending Duke Senior in the Forest of Arden. He agrees with the Duke when the latter says "sweet are the uses of adversity". He is not prepared to exchange his life in the forest with the comfortable life at the court. He is deeply attached to Duke Senior and, therefore, has willingly accompanied him to the forest of Arden. Amiens does not, in any way, contribute to the action of the play. He does however sing two songs that allude to and perhaps clarify the plot.

The Household of the deceased Sir Rowland de Boys

Oliver de Boys
Oliver is the eldest son of Sir Rowland de Boys and the heir to his father's estates. In the beginning of the play he appears as a usurper like Duke Frederick. He ill-treats his younger brother Orlando, denies him good upbringing and education. He acts like a villain and even tries to kill Orlando by instigating the wrestler, Charles. By the end of the play he gets reformed and falls in love with Celia - which contributes to the happy ending of the play.

Jacques de Boys
He is the second son of Sir Rowland de Boys and the brother of Oliver and Orlando. He only appears at the end of the play when he brings the news of Duke Frederick's reformation.

Orlando de Boys

Adam
Adam is the old faithful servant of the family of Sir Rowland de Boys, who spent four-score years in the family with unflinching devotion to his master. His loyalty to the old master is evidenced by the touching reference to the dead master when Oliver calls him an old dog. He loves Orlando, because
he is the image and 'memory of old Sir Rowland'. He places all the savings of his thrifty life and faces all unknown perils to save the life of the young master from the clutches of the cruel brother. Thus Adam has the 'soul of a servant to him'.

Dennis
He is a servant in the household of Oliver de Boys.

Country folk in the Forest of Arden

Phoebe
A shepherdess who is in love with Ganymede who is really Rosalind in disguise. At the same time Silvius (another shepherd) who is madly in love with Phoebe tries to get her to love him back.

Silvius
Silvius is a young shepherd who represents the romantic lover. He is madly in love with Phoebe, a rural girl who does not return his love. Throughout the play, Silvius behaves like a love-sick youth, pining away for Phoebe. He commits many follies and performs many ridiculous actions; even threatening to commit suicide if his love is not returned.
Silvius is a typical dejected lover who has no self-respect. Phoebe treats him in an indifferent manner and exploits him to acquire the love of Ganymede whom she loves. She constantly rebukes and insults Silvius, yet he longs for her love. Rosalind feels sympathy for him and scolds him for having become a 'tame snake' because of his passion for Phoebe. Finally, he marries Phoebe with the clever manipulation of Rosalind.

Audrey

Audrey is a homely and ignorant shepherd girl. Touchstone introduces her to the Duke as 'a poor virgin, sir, an ill-favoured thing, sir, but mine own'. She is attracted by the courtly manners and wit of Touchstone and Touchstone probably discovers in her rich honesty. Their love is a parody of the romantic love of the hero and the heroine of the play.

Corin

Corin is an old shepherd that, despite being in love during his youth, has outgrown his folly and attained worldly wisdom. He feels deeply for the enamored Silvius and tries to console him. He is a simple-hearted shepherd who eats what he earns, envies no man's happiness, and is content with his lot. Touchstone calls him a 'natural philosopher'. Corin is an innocent rustic with a good deal of humanity in him. While thinking straightforwardly he never has any inhibitions to proclaim what is on his mind. For Corin, cause and effect exist in a vacuum without any further complexity or need for explanation. Life is seen from a simplistic point of view that renders him much easier to be happy. Corin's simple way of looking at life and things around him make him an intellectually esteemed member of the play who frequently critiques the complexities of the court.

William

William is a country lad - humble and silly. He comes to profess his love for Audrey but during his conversation with Touchstone, he does not show the depth of his feelings. He appears to be a coward. When he is threatened that he would be beaten and killed if he does not give up Audrey, he does not challenge Touchstone, his rival in love. Audrey's silence and her request that William should go away shows that the love between William and Audrey is superficial.

Sir Oliver Martext
Sir Oliver Martext is a vicar who is called to perform the marriage of Touchstone and Audrey.

Other characters

Lords and ladies in Duke Frederick's court

Lords in Duke Senior's forest court

Pages and musicians

Hymen, the God of Marriage

As You Like It
Shakespearean characters
Theatre characters introduced in 1599
As You Like It